The Family Nobody Wanted is a 1954 memoir by Helen Doss (née Grigsby). It retells the story of how Doss and her husband Carl, a Methodist minister, adopted twelve children of various ethnic backgrounds (White Americans, Chinese, Japanese, Filipino, Korean, Mexican, and Native American).

Summary 
"I didn't yearn for a career, or maids and a fur coat, or a trip to Europe. All in the world I wanted was a happy, normal little family. Perhaps, if God could arrange it, Carl and I could have a boy first, and after that, a little girl. God didn't arrange it."

Thus opens the story of the Doss family. After Helen and Carl are told they cannot have biological children, Carl suggests adopting an infant. After some initial obstacles, they adopt a six-week-old, blonde, blue-eyed baby boy, who actually looks like Carl. After Donny joins the family, they try to adopt another child, hoping for a little girl this time. They face a lot of resistance from the agencies due to their financial situation as well as the fact that they already have a child. They pursue private adoption for a time, but after failure, they return to the agencies.

A social worker makes a stray comment about a Turkish-Portuguese baby that they can't place, saying "That's what happens with those mixed-blood children...Nobody wants them. They are classed as unadoptable, same as any child with a defect." Helen and Carl are shocked and horrified that anyone would reject a child and offer to adopt him. The agency refuses to place the child with them, claiming that they "would rather see a child raised in an orphanage, than by parents who look so different." Helen and Carl realize that other agencies may not feel the same way and decide to pursue adoption of "unadoptable children."

Finally, they are contacted about a two-month-old baby girl. The birth parents are Filipino-Chinese and English-French. Helen names her Laura after Carl's mother. Two weeks later they adopt Susie, who is blond with blue eyes, but considered unadoptable because she is frail/sickly and has a birth mark on her face. 

When Donny gets older, he wants a brother "just his size." Many of the subsequent adoptions occur as a by-product of trying to find Donny's missing brother.
The Dosses adopt a total of 12 children. In their final adoption, when Donny is 9, they gain baby Gregory, 9-year-old Dorothy, and Richard, age 9,- Donny's long awaited brother. Through the years, they deal with racism and prejudice from neighbors, family members, and the children's classmates.

The Children 

Donny-one of the "triplets;" first child
Richard-one of the "triplets;" one of the last three adopted
Dorothy-one of the "triplets;" one of the last three adopted
Elaine-one of the "quads;" Diane's biological half-sister
Laura-one of the "quads;" second child, adopted two weeks before Susie
Susie-one of the "quads;" third child, adopted two weeks after Laura
Teddy-one of the "quads;" adopted fourth
Diane-Elaine's biological half-sister
Rita-adopted fifth
Timmy-adopted sixth
Alex-adopted seventh
Gregory-one of the last three adopted

In popular culture 
The couple appeared on a 1954 episode of You Bet Your Life with Groucho Marx, where they talked about their story.

The story was also featured in The Family Nobody Wanted, a 1956 episode of Playhouse 90 directed by a young John Frankenheimer and made into a 1975 ABC Movie of the Week starring Shirley Jones of The Partridge Family fame.

References

External links
  
 

1954 non-fiction books
American memoirs
Adoption in the United States
Little, Brown and Company books
1975 television films
1975 films
ABC Movie of the Week
Films based on non-fiction books